Hattie T. Scott Peterson (1913–1993) is believed to be the first African-American woman to gain a bachelor's degree in civil engineering.

Biography

Hattie Scott was born in Norfolk, Virginia on October 11, 1913, to Hattie (Wilkinson) and Uzeil Scott. She married Donald Charles Peterson in 1943.

In 1946, Peterson graduated from Howard University with a Bachelor of Science in Civil Engineering, and began working as a survey and cartographic engineer for the U.S. Geological Survey (USGS) in Sacramento, California in 1947.

She joined the local U.S. Army Corps of Engineers (USACE) in 1954, where she was the first woman engineer and encouraged engineering as a profession for women.

Peterson was a member of the National Technical Association, the American Society for Photogrammetry and Remote Sensing (ASPRS), and the Unitarian Church. She was also a member of the Alpha Kappa Alpha sorority. She died on April 10, 1993 in Sacramento. She and her husband left an endowment for scholarships at Howard University.

Honor

The Sacramento district of the USACE grants a Hattie Peterson Inspirational Award annually in her honor: "The purpose of the Hattie Peterson Award is to recognize the Sacramento District individual whose actions best exemplify the highest qualities of personal and professional perseverance through social challenges."

References

1913 births
1993 deaths
African-American women engineers
African-American engineers
Howard University alumni
American civil engineers
United States Geological Survey personnel
People from Sacramento, California
American women engineers
Engineers from California
20th-century American engineers
20th-century women engineers
20th-century African-American women
20th-century African-American people